Suaeda maritima is a species of flowering plant in the family Amaranthaceae known by the common names herbaceous seepweed and annual seablite.

Description 
It is a yellow-green shrub with fleshy, succulent leaves and green flowers. It grows to about 35 cm in salt marshes. It is edible as a leaf vegetable, and due to its high salt content it can be used in combination with other foods as a seasoning. It is found worldwide, but in North America it is primarily located on the northern east coast.

Habitat 
This plant resides in aquatic, terrestrial, and wetland habitats. But mainly in salt marshes and sea shores, usually below the high water mark. Additionally, Suaeda maritima is able to catch mud and help build up the marshes.

Development 
The leaves are simple and arranged alternatively, with one leaf per node along the stem. Their leaves also absorb large amounts of salt and will turn red when oversaturated. The flower can be either radially symmetrical or bilaterally symmetrical.

Life Cycle 
The life cycle of Suaeda maritima is known to be mainly annually. This plant will perform its entire life cycle from seed to flower then back to a seed within a single growing season. All roots, stems and leaves of the Suaeda maritima plant will die and the only thing that can bridge the gap between each generation is a dormant seed.

Medicine 
There are currently no known medical sources that the Suaeda maritima plant is used for.

Food 
The young leaves of sea blite can be consumed raw or cooked,  although it has a strong salty flavor. The seeds can also be consumed raw or cooked. The ashes of the sea blite have been used to create a material used in making soap and glass.

References 

maritima
Halophytes
Barilla plants
Flora of Canada
Flora of the Northeastern United States
Flora of the Southeastern United States
Flora of Malta
Flora without expected TNC conservation status